The Trieste AREA Science Park is composed of two neighbouring campus developments located near the exit from the motorway linking Trieste to Austria and Slovenia. It covers 50 hectares, extendable to 150, in the magnificent natural setting of the Karst Plateau.

Operational since 1982, the AREA Science Park was founded with the initial aim of providing a link between the business community and the many high-level international scientific institutions in Trieste. It is now the most important multi-sector science park in Italy and one of the foremost in Europe.

The park has about 23,000 sq metres of laboratory space equipped with specialised apparatus, experimental and safety equipment, in addition to offices and service facilities (Conference Centre, meeting rooms, teaching labs, cafeteria, etc.). An additional area of about 1,500 sq metres is currently available for new activities. The following services are also available: information and computers, legal, fiscal and accounting consultancy, engineering and plant technology, occupational health and safety, marketing and promotion, information and assistance on EU programmes.

There are incentives for small and medium-sized companies entering into research contracts with the AREA Science Park. They may be direct (contributions to cover costs, in capital or towards interest payments) or in other forms of support (purchase of hired instruments, fellowships, assistance and consultancy services). "Research laboratories whose aim is to promote industry in technologically advanced sectors with a substantial and highly-qualified workforce" intending to establish themselves in the AREA Science Park may also have access to financing provided by Autonomous Region of Friuli Venezia Giulia.

Intensive training of school-leavers and graduates has so far led to jobs for over 100 young people in the research and productive structures within the Science Park or outside it. The fellowships awarded by the Consortium privilege training in the institutes, centres and companies of the Area itself. Under the programmes included in the European Commission Objective 2, the Consortium supervises the training of graduates in the sector of innovation transfers to create solid bonds between the world of research and small and medium-sized companies.

The Science Park currently has 38 established units, divided into the following sectors:

 highly specialised research and training centres;
 research and development and service centres of outside companies;
 new companies originating from the availability of specialised services, know-how and facilities encouraged by the Park;
 the special ELETTRA Laboratory project.

External links 
 AREA Science Park Official Site

Science parks in Italy
Trieste